The 2007 Turkmenistan Higher League (Ýokary Liga) season was the fifteenth season of Turkmenistan's professional football league. Eight teams competed in 2007.

Final table

External links
 

Ýokary Liga seasons
Turk
Turk
1